Eucamaragnathus is a genus of ground beetles in the subfamily Hiletinae.

Distribution and habitat 
The 15 different species of Eucamaragnathus live on various continents. E. amapa, E. batesi, E. brasiliensis, and E. jaws live in South America. Five other species live throughout India and Southeast Asia, in the Indomalayan realm, while the remaining 6 species live throughout Africa, mostly in the tropics.

The species of Eucamaragnathus mostly live in the soils within forests, usually tropical or deciduous. They can also be found in savannas.

Classification 
Eucamaragnathus contains 15 species. However, due to the fact that the species Eucamaragnathus desenderi was only recently discovered, many sources still claim that the genus only contains 14 species.

The following diagram shows how all of the species in the genus are related to one another. This diagram does not include E. desenderi.

References 

Carabidae genera
Hiletinae
Beetles described in 1937